The 1951 Washington Senators won 62 games, lost 92, and finished in seventh place in the American League. They were managed by Bucky Harris and played home games at Griffith Stadium.

Offseason 
 December 4, 1950: Rubén Gómez was drafted by the Senators from the St. Jean Braves in the 1950 minor league draft.

Regular season

Season standings

Record vs. opponents

Notable transactions 
 June 1951: Rubén Gómez was returned by the Washington Senators to the St. Jean Braves.

Roster

Player stats

Batting

Starters by position 
Note: Pos = Position; G = Games played; AB = At bats; H = Hits; Avg. = Batting average; HR = Home runs; RBI = Runs batted in

Other batters 
Note: G = Games played; AB = At bats; H = Hits; Avg. = Batting average; HR = Home runs; RBI = Runs batted in

Pitching

Starting pitchers 
Note: G = Games pitched; IP = Innings pitched; W = Wins; L = Losses; ERA = Earned run average; SO = Strikeouts

Other pitchers 
Note: G = Games pitched; IP = Innings pitched; W = Wins; L = Losses; ERA = Earned run average; SO = Strikeouts

Relief pitchers 
Note: G = Games pitched; W = Wins; L = Losses; SV = Saves; ERA = Earned run average; SO = Strikeouts

Farm system 

LEAGUE CHAMPIONS: Fulton

References

External links
1951 Washington Senators at Baseball-Reference
1951 Washington Senators team page at www.baseball-almanac.com

Minnesota Twins seasons
Washington Senators season
Washing